Kaliyur is a village in Sathyamangalam taluk in Erode district, Tamil Nadu. This village is a boundary between Nilgiris (Lok Sabha constituency) and Tirupur (Lok Sabha constituency).

Villages in Erode district